Alessandro Brustenghi, OFM (born in Assisi, Italy on 21 April 1978) also known as Friar Alessandro or at times Brother Alessandro (in English), Frate Alessandro (in Italian) or Frère Alessandro (in French) is an Italian Franciscan friar and a tenor singer of religious music. He is also the first religious brother to land an exclusive record contract with a major record label, in this case Universal Music.

Friar Alessandro's debut album is called Voice from Assisi (in Italian La voce da Assisi or in French La voix d'Assise). It was released on 15 October 2012. The initial single is a double-A side release, the tracks "Panis Angelicus" and "Sancta Maria". The first is the penultimate strophe of the hymn Sacris solemniis written by Saint Thomas Aquinas for the Feast of Corpus Christi and the second is from Cavalleria rusticana .

Biography
Alessandro Brustenghi started playing music at the age of 9, with a desire to be a percussionist. He started learning to play the piano and organ at 14. He also took part in choirs, but never as a lead singer. At 21, he joined the Franciscan order and sang at the Basilica of Santa Maria degli Angeli at Assisi, Italy where he worked as a joiner-carpenter.

The friars first noticed his beautiful tenor voice when he had to pass a vocal exam to enter the ministry. Some of his recordings were introduced to Mike Hedges (producer to U2, Dido, The Cure, Manic Street Preachers amongst others) who, after hearing his voice, offered him to produce an album of sacred music, both traditional and contemporary, in Abbey Road Studios.

To record the album, Friar Alessandro had to take a plane to London. This was the first time he traveled by air. In accordance with his religious vows, he does not travel far or accept monetary compensation to promote his album. He instead donates his share of proceeds to the Order of Friars Minor, his Roman Catholic religious community around the world.

Discography

Albums

Singles
2012: "Panis Angelicus" / "Sancta Maria"

References

External links
Friar Alessandro English website

Italian tenors
1978 births
Italian Friars Minor
Living people
People from Assisi
21st-century Italian  male singers
Carpenters